Neoanalthes wangi is a moth in the family Crambidae. It was described by Xi-Cui Du and Hou-Hun Li in 2008. It is found in Shaanxi, China.

References

Moths described in 2008
Spilomelinae